Depressizona axiosculpta is a species of sea snail, a marine gastropod mollusc in the family Depressizonidae.

It has also been placed in Scissurellidae.

Description
The shape of the shell is calyptraeiform.

Distribution
There is only one specimen in poor condition known from Tonga.

References

 Geiger D.L. (2012) Monograph of the little slit shells. Volume 1. Introduction, Scissurellidae. pp. 1-728. Volume 2. Anatomidae, Larocheidae, Depressizonidae, Sutilizonidae, Temnocinclidae. pp. 729–1291. Santa Barbara Museum of Natural History Monographs Number 7

Depressizonidae
Gastropods described in 2009